Paparoni is a surname of Italian origin. Notable people with the surname include:

 Alessandro Paparoni (born 1981), Italian volleyball player
 Carlos Paparoni (born 1986), Venezuelan politician
 Giovanni Paparoni (died  1153/1154), Italian Cardinal and papal legate 

Italian-language surnames